Juan Cipriano is a Filipino alpine skier who represented the Philippines at the 1972 Winter Olympics in Sapporo, Japan.

Early life
Born on May 18, 1952 in the Philippines, Cipriano along with his cousin Ben Nanasca were adopted by New Zealanders and left the Philippines in 1968.

Cipriano, his cousin and their adopted family resided in Andorra where the cousins skied in the Pyrenees. They later resided in Spain, France and Switzerland.

Career
Cipriano and Nanasca were scouted by the Swiss government and became part of an alpine skiing development group. The government sponsored their training. The two later qualified to compete at the 1972 Winter Olympics in Sapporo, Japan for the Philippines. They became the first Filipino Winter Olympians. Cipriano did not finish in the slalom and giant slalom events.

References

External links
 

1952 births
Living people
Filipino male alpine skiers
Olympic alpine skiers of the Philippines
Alpine skiers at the 1972 Winter Olympics
Filipino expatriates in Andorra
Filipino expatriates in France
Filipino expatriates in Spain
Filipino expatriates in Switzerland
Filipino adoptees